Depressaria erzurumella is a moth in the family Depressariidae. It was described by Alexandr L. Lvovsky in 1996. It is found in Turkey.

References

Moths described in 1996
Depressaria
Moths of Asia